An Evening With was an Australian television series which aired from 1966 to 1967 on Canberra station CTC-7. Hosted by David Brice and broadcast monthly, the series was a variety show, and featured both Canberra-based and interstate talent. Little Pattie appeared as the main performer in a 1967 episode.

See also
Tonight in Canberra

References

Seven Network original programming
1966 Australian television series debuts
1967 Australian television series endings
Black-and-white Australian television shows
English-language television shows
Australian variety television shows